Aleksandr Kisakov (born 1 November 2002) is a Russian ice hockey forward who currently plays for the Rochester Americans of the AHL as a prospect to the Buffalo Sabres of the National Hockey League (NHL).  He made his KHL debut for Dynamo Moscow during the 2021–22 season. He was drafted by the Buffalo Sabres of the NHL in the 2nd round of the 2021 NHL Entry Draft with the 53rd overall pick of the draft.

References

External links
 

2002 births
Living people
People from Solikamsk
Sportspeople from Perm Krai
Russian ice hockey forwards
Dynamo Moscow players
Buffalo Sabres draft picks